Sierra Baron is a 1958 American Western CinemaScope color film directed by James B. Clark and starring Brian Keith, Rick Jason and Rita Gam, from the novel by Thomas W. Blackburn.

Plot summary

In 1848, a rancher, Miguel Delmonte (Rick Jason) tries to protect his Princessa Spanish land grant, from American landgrabbers after his father is killed. Real estate agent Rufus Bynum (Steve Brodie), hires a Texas gunfighter Jack McCracken (Brian Keith) to kill the man. The gunfighter ends up falling in love with the rancher's sister Felicia (Rita Gam).

Cast
 Brian Keith as Jack McCracken  
 Rick Jason as Miguel Delmonte  
 Rita Gam as Felicia Delmonte  
 Mala Powers as Sue Russell  
 Lewis Allan as Hank Moe  
 Pedro Galván as Judson Jeffers  
 Fernando Wagner as Grandall  
 Steve Brodie as Rufus Bynum  
 Carlos Múzquiz as Andrews  
 Lee Morgan as Frank Goheen  
 Enrique Lucero as Anselmo  
 Alberto Mariscal as Lopez  
 Lynne Ehrlich as Vicky Russell  
 Michael Schmidt as Ralph  
 Tommy Riste as Ralph's Father

Production
The novel was published in 1955. The New York Times called it a "grade A novel". In May 1956 the novel was optioned by the sons of Spyros Skouras, Plato and Spyros Jnr, who had formed a production company, Artys Co, with their cousin Charles Spyros Jnr, son of Charles Skouras. André de Toth and John Hawkins wrote a script with De Toth intending to direct; the Skouras brothers wanted Gregory Peck and Jack Palance to star.

Eventually rights shifted to Regal Films Inc and the film was made as part of Regal's ten films in three months. De Toth did not direct.

The film was shot back to back with Villa!! in Mexico, in and around Estudios Churubusco in Mexico City.

References

External links 
 
 
 
 
 

1958 films
1958 Western (genre) films
Films based on American novels
Films based on Western (genre) novels
20th Century Fox films
CinemaScope films
American Western (genre) films
Films directed by James B. Clark
Films shot in Mexico
Films scored by Paul Sawtell
1950s English-language films
1950s American films